The Kuwait Governorate was the 19th governorate of Iraq established in the aftermath of the invasion of Kuwait by Iraq in 1990. It was preceded by the brief puppet state of the Republic of Kuwait. The Kuwait Governorate consisted of most of the occupied Kuwaiti territory, with the exclusion of the northern areas which became the Saddamiyat al-Mitla' District. Saddam Hussein's relative, Ali Hassan al-Majid became the governor of this province.

References 

Annexation
Irredentism
Military occupation
Gulf War
1990 establishments in Kuwait
1991 disestablishments in Kuwait
History of Kuwait